The GP Antalya is a cycling race held in Turkey. It is part of UCI Europe Tour in category 1.2.

Winners

References

Cycle races in Turkey
2020 establishments in Turkey
Recurring sporting events established in 2020
UCI Europe Tour races